Palauan is a Malayo-Polynesian language native to the Republic of Palau, where it is one of the two official languages, alongside English. It is widely used in day-to-day life in the country. Palauan is not closely related to other Malayo-Polynesian languages and its exact classification within the branch is unclear.

Classification

Roger Blench (2015) argues that based on evidence from fish names, Palauan had early contact with Oceanic languages either directly or indirectly via the Yapese language. These include fish names for the sea eel, yellowfin tuna (Thunnus albacares), left-eye flounder (Bothus mancus), triggerfish, sailfish, barracuda (Sphyraena barracuda), damsel fish (Abudefduf sp.), squirrelfish (Holocentrus spp.), unicorn fish (Naso spp.), trevally, land crab (Cardisoma rotundus), and wrasse. This suggests that Oceanic speakers had influenced the fishing culture of Palau, and had been fishing and trading in the vicinity of Palau for quite some time. Blench (2015) also suggests that the Palauan language displays influence from Central Philippine languages and Samalic languages.

Phonology
The phonemic inventory of Palauan consists of 10 consonants and 6 vowels.  Phonetic charts of the vowel and consonant phonemes are provided below, utilizing the International Phonetic Alphabet (IPA).

While the phonemic inventory of Palauan is relatively small, comparatively, many phonemes contain at least two allophones that surface as the result of various phonological processes within the language.  The full phonetic inventory of consonants is given below in IPA (the phonemic inventory of vowels, above, is complete).

Diphthongs
Palauan contains several diphthongs (sequences of vowels within a single syllable).

Others do not behave as clearly like monosyllabic diphthongs.

Writing system
In the early 1970s, the Palau Orthography Committee worked with linguists from the University of Hawaii to devise an alphabet based on the Latin script.  The resulting orthography was largely based on the "one phoneme/one symbol" notion, producing an alphabet of twelve native consonants, six consonants for use in loan words, and ten vowels.  The 20 vowel sequences listed under Diphthongs are also all officially recognized in the orthography.

Most of the letters/graphemes in written Palauan correspond to phonemes that can be represented by the corresponding segments in the International Phonetic Alphabet , e.g., Palauan b is the phoneme . Three notable exceptions are worth mentioning. The first is ch, which is invariably pronounced as a glottal stop . The ch digraph is a remnant of an earlier writing system developed during German occupation when the glottal stop was pronounced as a fricative . Some older Palauans still remember their grandparents pronouncing ch this way. The second is e, which represents either the full vowel  in primary and secondary stressed syllables, or a schwa  in unstressed syllables; the conditions are similar to those of English vowel reduction (and note that stress in Palauan is largely penultimate, with many semi-regular exceptions). There is no phonemic  in Palauan.

The bill also establishes an Orthography Commission to maintain the language as it develops as well as to oversee and regulate any additions or modifications to the current official orthography.

Grammar

Pronouns 
The following set of pronouns are the pronouns found in the Palauan language:

Noun inflection
Palauan nouns inflect based on humanness and number via the plural prefix , which attaches to plural human nouns (see ).  For example, the word  'person' is a human noun that is unambiguously singular, whereas the noun  people is a human noun that is unambiguously plural.  Non-human nouns do not display this distinction, e.g., the word for 'stone', can denote either a singular 'stone' or multiple 'stones.'

Some possessed nouns in Palauan also inflect to agree with the person, number, and humanness of their possessors.  For example, the unpossessed noun  means simply 'table,' whereas one of its possessed forms  means 'my table.'  Possessor agreement is always registered via the addition of a suffix to the noun (also triggering a shift in stress to the suffix).  The possessor agreement suffixes have many different irregular forms that only attach to particular nouns, and they must be memorized on a noun-by-noun basis .  However, there is a "default" set (see  and ), shown below:

Palauan verb morphology is highly complex. 'food' and taking into consideration morphophonemic patterns:  'the dog was eating fish' (lit. it VERB PREFIX-m eat-PAST INFIX-il- ARTICLE fish ARTICLE dog);  'The dog eats up fish' (lit. it-eat-PERFECTIVE-INFIX-m- fish ARTICLE dog). The verb system points to fossilized forms related to the Philiippine languages.

Word order
The word order of Palauan is usually thought to be verb–object–subject (VOS), but this has been a matter of some debate in the linguistic literature.  Those who accept the VOS analysis of Palauan word order generally treat Palauan as a pro-drop language with preverbal subject agreement morphemes, final pronominal subjects are deleted (or null).

Example 1:  .  (means: 'I was eating the apple.')

In the preceding example, the abstract null pronoun  is the subject 'I,' while the clause-initial  is the first person singular subject agreement morpheme.

On the other hand, those who have analyzed Palauan as SVO necessarily reject the pro-drop analysis, instead analyzing the subject agreement morphemes as subject pronouns.  In the preceding example, SVO-advocates assume that there is no pro and that the morpheme  is simply an overt subject pronoun meaning 'I.'  One potential problem with this analysis is that it fails to explain why overt (3rd person) subjects occur clause-finally in the presence of a co-referring 3rd person "subject pronoun" --- treating the subject pronouns as agreement morphemes circumvents this weakness.  Consider the following example.

Example 2: .  (means: 'Satsuko was eating the apple.')

Proponents of the SVO analysis must assume a shifting of the subject  'Satsuko' from clause-initial to clause-final position, a movement operation that has not received acceptance cross-linguistically, but see  for discussion.

Palauan phrases
Some common and useful words and phrases in Palauan are listed below, with their English translations.

Palauan numerals
1 to 10:
 
 
 
 
 
 
 
 
 
 

Palauans have different numbers for different objects. Traditionally, there were separate counting sets for people, things, counting, ordinals, bunches of bananas, units of time, long objects, and rafts; however, several of these are no longer used.

Notes

References 
 

 .
 .
 .
 .
 .
 .
 .
 .
 .
 .
 .
 .
 .
 .
 .
 .
 .
 .
 .
 .
 .
 .
 .

External links 

 
 
 
 
 
 
 Robert Blust's fieldnotes for Palauan are archived at Kaipuleohone

 
Malayo-Polynesian languages
Languages of Palau